Jeanmarie Simpson (born November 20, 1959) is an American theatre artist and peace activist best known for writing and starring in the 2004 play A Single Woman, and its 2008 film adaptation, based on the life of first US Congresswoman, Jeannette Rankin.

Early life
Simpson was born in Ray, Arizona. Her parents were Maria Luisa Jugo, a Venezuelan immigrant, and Donald Leroy Simpson, an American mining engineer. She is the great-granddaughter of Carlos López Bustamante. She was raised in rural Arizona. Her family's move to Toronto, Ontario, Canada in 1970 led to her theatre training.

Career
She was founding artistic director of the Nevada Shakespeare Company for which she directed many acclaimed productions and played iconic characters including Maude Gonne and Lady Macbeth. She retired from the company in 2008.

Simpson appeared in the American premier of the one-woman play, Shakespeare's Will, by Canadian playwright, Vern Thiessen. The production was presented by Theatre 40 in Beverly Hills, California, and was produced by Leonard Nimoy and directed by Susan Bay.

In one of his few American directing projects, Tony Award winner, Zakes Mokae cast Simpson as Elsa in Athol Fugard's The Road to Mecca in 2003.The production was a collaboration between the Nevada Shakespeare Company and the Nevada Conservatory Theatre, based at the University of Nevada in Las Vegas.  

She starred in the film version of her play, A Single Woman, based on the life of Jeannette Rankin. The film was produced by Heroica Films and directed by Kamala Lopez, a cousin of Simpson's. Though the project includes the voices of many celebrities, including Martin Sheen, Peter Coyote, Judd Nelson and Patricia Arquette and includes in its soundtrack the iconic Joni Mitchell songs "Woodstock" and "The Circle Game", the film has not been picked up by a distributor, nor has it had a theatrical release. Simpson was unhappy with the film, and in October 2011 she is quoted in the Huffington Post saying of it, "That's probably the biggest disappointment of my life." 

In September 2009, Simpson opened in Tucson, Arizona in the one-woman show, Coming In Hot, based on the book Powder: writing by women in the ranks from Vietnam to Iraq. The show subsequently toured extensively, and garnered praise and also a fair amount of criticism by peace activists who thought it glorified war.

On July 4, 2012, Simpson presented at the University of Rhode Island a reading of her play, Heretic - The Mary Dyer Story, about the life of Mary Dyer, a Quaker hanged in Boston in 1660. In January 2015, it was announced that Simpson would tour the UK and Europe with Heretic, presented by The Leaveners. The play was subsequently filmed with an ASL interpreter on camera and Simpson's voice. Titled Heretic - the Mary Dyer story the film may be viewed at no cost on YouTube with subtitles in more
than 300 languages.

On September 16, 2012, a story in the Arizona Daily Star featured quotes by Simpson. The article focused on an art exhibit that was to have been presented at the Quaker Meeting house in Tucson. The artist was Danny Jones, a death-row inmate in Arizona. Among other things, Simpson was quoted saying, "We want to illuminate the fact that he is a human being. He is not his crime... He is an artist. He is a man with the ability to see beauty and to create beauty." The show was subsequently canceled, when it was discovered that it was scheduled on the same day as the National Day of Remembrance for Murder Victims.

In December 2012, Judd Nelson was quoted saying of her, "Simply put (and nothing about her can be put simply), Jeanmarie Simpson is a bright, enthusiastic, and powerful performer and an even more gifted and inspiring writer. Those two tenants living side-by-side within her are not natural brethren. Neither of them are given much to supplication, nor have a natural instinct for compromise. But, amazingly, they are able to co-exist within her, because they are secondary to Jeanmarie's elemental conflict: the struggle between her huge heart and her mighty mind, between impression and fact, between situational ethics and absolute truth. You and I, the outsiders, the spectators watching, we are the lucky ones able to receive her wisdom, and courage, and truth, and hope, and grace. Ultimately, I believe Jeanmarie to be one of humanity's invaluable resources."

Activism
Jeanmarie Simpson is a Lifetime Member of the Women's International League for Peace and Freedom (WILPF), serving as treasurer of the US Section as of March, 2016. She has been a pacifist and human rights/peace activist since 1984, when she observed the disparity between the wealthy and socio-economically challenged members of society while working as a Special Projects Coordinator for Consolidated Agencies of Human Service in Hawthorne, Nevada.

After September 11, 2001, Simpson, a "self-described artivist," retreated from traditional theatre and began creating biographical works, political in nature, based on the lives of historical women.

Several political commentaries by Simpson can be found on Common Dreams.

Personal life
Simpson is the mother of Domenic Francis Stockton, Donald Paul Stockton and Emily Maria Harbaugh. She is the grandmother of Casey Joel Stockton, Wesley Bradon Stockton, William Christopher Stockton and Walker Wolfgang Kilgore-Stockton. She remarried her first husband, Daniel Bishop, on August 28, 2015. The two were first married on July 24, 1976.

Current activities
Simpson is one of the founders and the artistic director of Arizona Theatre Matters, based in Phoenix, Arizona.
Simpson's play about Mary Dyer was filmed with an ASL interpreter on camera and Simpson's voice. It is available on YouTube, subtitled in 110 languages. Her play, Pineapple and Other Options, was produced and filmed in November 2021 and is in post-production as of September 2022.

See also
List of peace activists
A Single Woman, play

References

External links
Official Website

1959 births
Activists from Arizona
Activists from Toronto
American stage actresses
American socialists
Socialist feminists
Living people
American anti-war activists
American pacifists
Feminist artists
American emigrants to Canada
American women dramatists and playwrights
People from Pinal County, Arizona
People from Ray, Arizona
American Quakers
American people of Venezuelan descent
Actresses from Arizona
Actresses from Toronto
Pacifist feminists
Writers from Arizona
Writers from Toronto
Women's International League for Peace and Freedom people
Quaker feminists
20th-century American actresses
21st-century American actresses